The thirteenth series of British talent competition programme Britain's Got Talent was broadcast on ITV, from 6 April to 2 June 2019. This series became the first to see the return of Ant McPartlin to his television duties, hosting alongside Dec Donnelly (colloquially forming the hosting duo known as Ant & Dec), following his absence the previous year to attend rehabilitation prior to the start of the previous series' live episodes. Alongside McPartlin's return, the competition for this year saw the oldest participant to win Britain's Got Talent, and the surprise return of a performer who participated in a previous year's contest, operating under an alias until their final appearance.

The thirteenth series was won by 89-year-old singer Colin Thackery  finishing in first place and mentalist Marc Spelmann (under the stage name "X") finishing in second place. During its broadcast, the series averaged 8.32 million viewers.

Series overview
The judges' auditions took place between January and February 2019, within London and Manchester. During filming of the London auditions, the event was kick-started by a special performance from Susan Boyle to mark her tenth year as a singer since she first made her appearance on Britain's Got Talents third series. One of the most notable auditionees for this year's contest was David J. Watson – a participant who had auditioned for ten years for a place on the programme without success. His latest attempt led to the host of Britain's Got More Talent, Stephen Mulhern, triggering a Golden Buzzer for him. This action led to speculation in the media over whether this had been officially allowed, but it was later revealed to have been disallowed on the grounds that it did not fall under the contest rules, as Mulhern had no official allowance to provide a Golden Buzzer act.

This series featured two notable events during its broadcast. The first to take place was the forced withdrawal of an act – extreme magicians Brotherhood – who had secured a spot in the semi-finals. Despite Brotherhood's success in the auditions landing them a place in the fifth and final semi-final, concerns over health and safety were raised about the dangerous nature of their performance, leading to the group of magicians withdrawing their involvement at the request of the production staff and broadcaster, and their place being offered to another act which had been eliminated during auditions. The second was the surprise revelation that a participant who had operated under anonymity was in reality a former semi-finalist from a previous year's contest who had re-entered the contest for this year in order to emphasise the values of hope and perseverance.

Of the participants that took part, only 40 made it into the five live semi-finals – of these acts, dancer Akshat Singh, band Chapter 13, choir Flakefleet Primary School, singer Giorgia Borg, and stand-up comedian Kojo Anim each received a golden buzzer during their auditions – with eight appearing in each one, and eleven of these acts making it into the live final; the wildcard act chosen by the judges was dance duo Libby & Charlie, after they lost out in a tied judges' vote in the last semi-final round. The following below lists the results of each participant's overall performance in this series:

 |  |  | 
 Judges' Wildcard Finalist |  Golden Buzzer Audition

  Ages denoted for a participant(s), pertain to their final performance for this series.
  These acts originally auditioned under different names, before changing them for their Semi-Final appearances.
  These participants each required their coach to act as translator, due to their limited or lack of knowledge on the English language.
  This participant initially failed to reach the semi-finals, but were later brought back after another semi-finalist was forced to withdraw at the advice of production staff and the broadcaster.
  Details on both the locations for and ages of each member of The Haunting were not disclosed during their time on the programme.
  This participant's actual age was not officially disclosed as such during their time on the programme.
  Marc Spelmann's identity was kept a secret by production staff throughout the series - all details listed here pertain to his unveiling in the final.

Semi-finals summary
 Buzzed out |  Judges' vote | 
 |  |

Semi-final 1 (27 May)
Guest Performers, Results Show: Cast Of On Your Feet! & Gloria Estefan

Semi-final 2 (28 May)
Guest Performers, Results Show: Cast of Six

Semi-final 3 (29 May)
Guest Performers, Results Show: James Arthur and Freckled Sky

  Due to the majority vote for Kojo Anim, Walliams' voting intention was not revealed.

Semi-final 4 (30 May)
Guest Performers, Results Show: BTS

Semi-final 5 (31 May)
Guest Performers, Results Show: Jason Donovan, Sheridan Smith & Cast Of Joseph and the Amazing Technicolor Dreamcoat

  Libby & Charlie were later sent through to the final as the judges' wildcard.

Final (2 June)
Guest Performers, Results Show: Diversity & DVJ, and Susan Boyle & Michael Ball
 |

Ratings

References

2019 British television seasons
Britain's Got Talent